Cloud, Castle, Lake is a short story anthology by Vladimir Nabokov. It contains five stories: "The Admiralty Spire," "Razor," "A Russian Beauty," "Cloud, Castle, Lake," and "Signs and Symbols."

Short story collections by Vladimir Nabokov
2005 short story collections